Paraguayan Sign Language, or Lengua de señas paraguaya (LSPY), is the deaf sign language of Paraguay. It is not intelligible with neighboring languages, nor with American Sign Language, but speakers report that it has historical connections with Uruguayan Sign Language. It developed outside the schools, and was only used in education "recently" (as of 2009).

Paraguay is notably a bilingual country, where both Spanish and Guarani are spoken. The Language Law No. 4251 provides for fingerspelling adequate to both languages.

Bibliography
Lichtenberger, Wilfried. 1990. Habla Conmigo: primer libro de aprendizaje de la lengua para escolares principiantes con difficultades en el lenguaje. Asunción: Centro Editorial Paraguayo S.R.L.
Lichtenberger, Wilfried. 1990. ''Guia linguistica y didactica del Habla Conmigo: primer libro de aprendizaje de la lengua para escolares principiantes con difficultades en el lenguaje para el Profesor especial. Asunción.

References 

Sign language isolates
Languages of Paraguay